Frederick Mackenzie McRobie (April 9, 1875 – November 1, 1961) was a Canadian amateur ice hockey player for the Montreal Victorias in the 1890s, playing defense. He won the Stanley Cup with the Victorias in 1899.

McRobie also worked as a ice hockey league executive, first as a secretary-treasurer and honorary president of the Canadian Amateur Hockey League and then, for the 1907 season, as the president of the Eastern Canada Amateur Hockey Association.

References

Notes

Canadian ice hockey players
Montreal Victorias players
Stanley Cup champions
1875 births
1961 deaths